Airey v. Ireland (application No. 6289/73) was a case decided by the European Court of Human Rights in 1979.

Facts
Mrs. Airey wished to obtain a decree of judicial separation from her husband (divorce was illegal in Ireland); at that time legal aid was not available in Ireland for any civil matters, including seeking a judicial separation.

Judgment
The Court held that:
there has been a breach of Article 6 para. 1 (fair trial) of the European Convention on Human Rights, by 5 votes to 2;
there has been a breach of Article 8 (private and family life), by 4 votes to 3;
it was not necessary also to examine the case under Article 14 (non-discrimination) taken in conjunction with Article 6 para. 1, by 4 votes to 3;
it was not necessary also to examine the case under Article 13 (effective remedy), by 4 votes to 3.

Judges Thór Vilhjálmsson, O'Donoghue and Evrigenis each filed a dissent.

Impact

In the case, it was established that the right of effective access to the courts may entail legal assistance. Airey case has been applied in a number of cases on civil legal aid.

References

External links
ECHR judgment

Divorce law
Legal aid
Article 13 of the European Convention on Human Rights
Article 14 of the European Convention on Human Rights
Article 8 of the European Convention on Human Rights
Article 6 of the European Convention on Human Rights
European Court of Human Rights cases involving Ireland
1979 in case law
1979 in Ireland